The First Pourier cabinet was the 10th cabinet of the Netherlands Antilles.

Composition
The cabinet was composed as follows:

|Minister of General Affairs and Development Cooperation
|Miguel Pourier
|UPB
|30 July 1979
|-
|Minister of Finance, Labor and Social Affairs, Public Health and Environmental Care
|Marco Jesus de Castro
|MAN
|30 July 1979
|-
|Minister of Justice and Constitutional Affairs
|Henri R. Fingal
|MEP
|30 July 1979
|-
|Minister of Education, Sports, Culture, Recreation and Social Welfare and Youth Affairs
|Jacques P. Veeris
|MAN
|30 July 1979
|-
|Minister of Economic Affairs, Traffic and Communications
|Arsenio C. Yarzagaray
|MEP
|30 July 1979
|}

References

Cabinets of the Netherlands Antilles
1979 establishments in the Netherlands Antilles
Cabinets established in 1979
Cabinets disestablished in 1979
1979 disestablishments in the Netherlands Antilles